The Kreuzkirche Zittau is a former church in Zittau, Saxony, Germany. The Gothic hall church, which has an unusual architecture, was used for funerals. It is now a museum, dedicated primarily to the presentation of a medieval textile, the Großes Zittauer Fastentuch.

History 

The church was built at end of the 14th century as a Gothic hall , following the model of the Church of Our Lady on the Lawn in Prague. It was probably dedicated in 1410. It was used for funerals. It was damaged by fire in 1643 and restored from 1651 to 1654, with a simpler exterior. The church was secularised in 1972 and subsequently neglected. It was restored again from 1986.

The church is used as a museum, presenting the medieval , a textile artwork from 1472. It has been exhibited since 1999 in the largest vitrine of any museum.

Literature 
 Barbara Bechter, Wiebke Fastenrath et al. (eds.): Dehio-Handbuch der Deutschen Kunstdenkmäler, Sachsen I, Regierungsbezirk Dresden. Deutscher Kunstverlag, Munich / Berlin 1996, pp. 874–876.
 Friedrich and Helga Möbius: Sakrale Baukunst. Union Verlag, Berlin 1958, p. 229.

References

External links 

 
 Stadtmuseum Zittau

Hall churches
Former churches in Germany
Buildings and structures completed in the 14th century